Nobody Loves an Albatross is a 1963 comedy play written by Ronald Alexander, which was performed at the Lyceum Theatre of Broadway, New York between 19 December 1963 and June 20, 1964.

It was produced by Elliot Martin and Philip Rose, directed by Gene Saks, scenery and lighting were by Will Steven Armstrong, costume design by Florence Klotz. The play, set in the "living room of Nathaniel Bentley's house in Beverly Hills", is a satire of the US television industry. It featured Robert Preston in the lead role.

Cast
Robert Preston as Nat Bentley 	
Jack Bittner as Sean O'Loughlin 	
Frank Campanella as L. T. Whitman 	
Constance Ford as Hildy Jones 	
Barnard Hughes as Bert Howell 	
Leslye Hunter as Diane Bentley 	
Leon Janney as Mike Harper 	
Gertrude Jeannette as Sarah Washington 	
Phil Leeds as Victor Talsey 	
Richard Mulligan as Phil Matthews 	
Carol Rossen as Jean Hart 	
Marie Wallace as Linda 	
Marian Winters as Marge Weber

In popular culture 
In Rosemary's Baby, Rosemary's husband Guy Woodhouse is said to have appeared in this play.

References

American plays
1963 plays
Satirical plays
Plays set in Los Angeles
Beverly Hills, California in fiction